Chiuli Shaik is a populated place situated in Pima County, Arizona, United States. Chiuli Shaik became its official name through a decision of the U.S. Geological Survey's Board on Geographic Names in 1941. It is also known by several unofficial names, including Fresnal, Kohi Kug, Koxikux, Resnal, and Tshiuliseik.

References

Populated places in Pima County, Arizona